"Shine" / "Ride On" is Tohoshinki's 13th Japanese single. The single was released on September 19, 2007. The single debuted at #2 only behind Ayumi Hamasaki's single "Talkin' 2 Myself" which outsold it by 36,634 copies. The song "Shine" is used as the theme song for the drama "Obanzai".

Track listing

CD (first press)
 "Shine"
 "Ride On"
 "Lovin' You: Haru's "Deep Water" Mix"
 "Shine" (Less Vocal)
 "Ride On" (Less Vocal)

CD (regular)
 "Shine"
 "Ride On"
 "Shine" (Less Vocal)
 "Ride On" (Less Vocal)

DVD
 "Shine" (Video clip)
 Off Shot Movie

Live performances
 September 24, 2007 - Hey! Hey! Hey!
 September 22, 2007 - NHK Music Japan

Release history

Charts

Oricon sales chart (Japan)

Korea monthly foreign albums & singles

Korea yearly foreign albums & singles

References

External links
 http://toho-jp.net/

2007 singles
TVXQ songs
Japanese television drama theme songs
Japanese-language songs